Juice Newton & Silver Spur is the eponymous debut studio album by country-rock trio Juice Newton & Silver Spur. The album contains Newton's first charting single, "Love Is a Word", and the original version of "The Sweetest Thing (I've Ever Known)", which was re-recorded in 1981 as a Newton solo piece and became a number-one hit.

Track listing

Personnel
Juice Newton – lead and background vocals; guitar
Otha Young – lead and background vocals; guitar; synthesizer
Tom Kealey – lead and background vocals; bass guitar, guitar
Hal Blaine – drums; percussion
Jeff Porcaro – drums
Mike Melvoin – keyboards; string arrangements
Rusty Young – dobro; pedal steel guitar

References

External links

1975 debut albums
Juice Newton albums
Albums produced by Bones Howe
RCA Records albums